M2K may refer to:

 Mew2King, a professional Super Smash Bros. player

 M2K Mini Tour, a mini tour by heavy metal band Metallica